The Enrollment Act of 1863 (enacted March 3, 1863) also known as the Civil War Military Draft Act, was an Act passed by the United States Congress during the American Civil War to provide fresh manpower for the Union Army. The Act was the first genuine national conscription law. The law required the enrollment of every male citizen and those immigrants (aliens) who had filed for citizenship, between 20 and 45 years of age, unless exempted by the Act. The Act replaced the Militia Act of 1862.

It set up under the Union Army an elaborate machine for enrolling and drafting men for conscription. Quotas were assigned in each state, and each congressional district, with deficiencies in volunteers being met by conscription.

In some cities, particularly New York City, enforcement of the act sparked civil unrest as the war dragged on, leading to the New York City draft riots on July 13–16, 1863.

Organization 

The Provost Marshal General was recreated to administer the national implementation of the Enrollment Act. James Barnet Fry was appointed to the position and answered directly to Secretary of War Edwin Stanton. Beneath Fry were the State Acting Assistant Provost Marshal Generals. The State Provost Marshal Generals were not authorized by the Enrollment Act, but were appointed personally by Fry to attend to matters in each individual state. New York and Pennsylvania were the only states that had more than one State Acting Assistant Marshal General; New York had three and Pennsylvania had two. Each state was divided along district lines with each district under the jurisdiction of an enrollment board.

Enrollment boards were headed by a district provost marshal and also included a surgeon and a commissioner. Each board employed clerks, deputies, and special agents as needed. They were divided into sub-districts along ward (in cities) and township (in rural areas) lines. In each sub-district a census was conducted by an enrollment officer to document every man eligible for the draft in the sub-district.

Criticism 

The policies of substitution and commutation were controversial practices that allowed drafted citizens to opt out of service by either furnishing a suitable substitute to take their place or paying $300. Both provisions were created to soften the effect of the draft on pacifists, the anti-draft movement, and the propertied classes. The result, however, was general public resentment of both policies. The two practices were major points of contention among the general public and led directly to the slogan "rich man's war, poor man's fight."

Substitution
Substitutions were available throughout the war. The problem with substitution was that it provided substitutes with powerful incentives to desert soon after enlisting. Career "jumpers" made a living by enlisting as a substitute, collecting their compensation, deserting before their units were dispatched to the front, and repeating the process. The problem was well known to the military commanders who regularly saw the same recruits. In addition, troops furnished by substitution were considered to be of an inferior quality in comparison to regulars and volunteers.

Commutation
Commutation (paying $300 to escape the draft, roughly the equivalent of $5,000 earned by an unskilled worker in 2018) was created in an effort to keep substitution prices low. If commutation were not instated, the price of a substitute would have quickly soared past $300.

Also, commutation was intended to raise money for the war effort. While commutation raised war funds, it was often a criticism of the draft that it was better at raising money than troops. The rationalization for commutation was that unwilling troops were ineffective and so the government might as well extract funds from the unwilling if it got poor service. Despite the good intentions behind commutation, it was one of the most hated policies of the war.

Amendments

1864 amendment

Section 5 of the Enrollment Act of 1864 limited the length of an exemption from the draft by payment of the commutation fee to one year, after which those drafted were required to serve or to furnish a substitute.

1865 amendment
Section 21 of the Enrollment Act of 1865 (passed on March 3, 1865), imposed denationalization (loss of citizenship) as a penalty for draft evasion or desertion. In Afroyim v. Rusk (1967), Justice John Marshall Harlan II's dissent mentioned the Enrollment Act of 1865 as an example of a law in which citizenship could be revoked without a person's consent and that the Congress regarded as constitutional.

See also
 Gangs of New York – a film depicting the riots the Act caused in New York City
 Conscription in the United States

References

Bibliography

External links

 Congressional Record - A full text of version of the 1863 Enrollment Act
 Commentary on the 1863 Enrollment Act on Answers.com
 Enrollment Act Riots on MrLincolnAndNewYork.org
 Map of Riot Locations - "Mr Lincoln and New York" web site (under grant from The Lehrman Institute)

United States federal defense and national security legislation
Washington, D.C., in the American Civil War
1863 in American law
1863 in the United States
37th United States Congress
Conscription in the United States
Conscription law